Young Bangla is a special initiative launched by Bangladeshi Government in 2014. The Young Bangla Programme comprises the several schemes, acting as a flexible space for the youth, thousands of individuals and youth-led organizations, supporting them with resources and capacity enhancement trainings.

History
Young Bangla campaign was launched by the Government of Bangladesh on 15 November 2014 to train over young people in Bangladesh in different skills by 2020.

Initiatives
 Skill Development Mission
 Vision 2020 Internship
 Joy Bangla Youth Award
 Joy Bangla Concert
 Tiger's Den
 Youth Policy Parliament
 Idea Submission for 50 Years Celebration
 Let's Talk

Joy Bangla Youth Award
The award is designed to recognize countrywide young changemakers, help them network among themselves and enhance the services they are already providing to their communities.

2017 winners

Sajeeb Wazed, ICT adviser to the prime minister, presented the awards to the top 30 winners at a function held at the jam-packed auditorium of Sheikh Hasina National Youth Centre in Savar on October 21, 2017.
Kaktarua, Sylhet
Barisal Youth Society, Barisal
Shopno Dakho Social Welfare Organization, Jessore
Be Related to Audio Visual Education (BRAVE), Chandpur
Iccheypuron Samajik Sangathan, Sylhet
Durbur Foundation, Comilla
IPositive, Thakurgaon
Model Live Stock Advancement Foundation, Dhaka
Jagoron Club, Satkhira
Potenga Protibondhi Unnoyon Shongothon, Chittagong
Kollol Foundation, Natore
Manobsheba Mulok Shongothon Prottoy, *Moulovibazar
Amar School, Gaibandha
Uttaran Bangladesh, Moulovibazar
SPaRC - Supporting People & Rebuilding Communities, Rangamati
WFH Foundation, Dhaka
Manob Kollankami Onathaloy, Netrokona
Shishu Bikash, Naogaon
Iccheypuron Samajik Sangathan, Sylhet
Shadheen, Dinajpur

2018 winners
 All for One Foundation, Dhaka
 Nari Shakti Jagaroni Foundation, Panchagarh
 Lalmonirhat Taekwon-Do Association
 Vorer Alo, Chattogram
 Akota Unnoyon Shongothon, Jhenidah
 Poribesh O Haor Unnoyon Shongothon, Sunamganj
 Shikkhar Alo Pathshala, Dhaka
 Prothom Surjo Agro Farm, Jashore
 Jibon, Rangamati
 Sylhet Art and Autism Foundation
 Taru Chaya, Faridpur
 Social Welfare Institute, Mymensingh
 Light of Life, Dhaka
 The Flag Girl, Dhaka
 BD Assistant, Rangpur
 Gurukul, Kushtia
 Shopno Tori Foundation, Brahmanbaria
 Youth Net for Climate Justice, Barishal
 Ghuri Foundation, Barishal
 Salandar High School Women’s Basketball Team, *Thakurgaon
 Shishu Nat, Sylhet
 Safal Shrimp Service Center, Satkhira
 Anushilon Mojar School, Khulna
 Pran O Prokriti, Naogaon
 Tarunno 71, Kushtia
 Student Organization of Youth Power, Gaibandha
 University Tea Student Association, Moulvibazar
 Protibondhi Kollayan Shamiti, Mymensingh
 Shopno Jatri Foundation, Chattogram
 Projukti O Projonmo, Dhaka

References

2014 establishments in Bangladesh